Tilt is the twelfth studio album by the American/English solo artist Scott Walker. It was released on 8 May 1995. It was Walker's first studio album in eleven years.

Walker composed the songs for the album between 1991 and 1992 except "Manhattan", which was written in 1987, and the final song "Rosary", which was composed in 1993. The album was recorded at RAK Studios and Townhouse Studios in the UK and its release had been expected as early as 1992 but was not completed until 1995. The album is the first installment of a "trilogy" that went on to include The Drift (2006) and Bish Bosch (2012).

Details
The songs on the album have a decidedly bleak, forlorn and funereal mood; the lyrics are replete with arcane allusions and recondite wordplay and ellipses.  Like Walker's previous effort, Climate of Hunter (1984), Tilt combines elements of European avant-garde and experimental elements, along with industrial music influences.  The unusual literary, musical and performance qualities of Walker's songwriting and singing are reminiscent of the lieder and "art song" traditions – forms which long predate the era of recorded popular music and electronic media.

The compositions emphasize abstract atmospherics over harmonic structure, with minimalist, slightly discordant "sound blocks" and trance-like repetition rendered through carefully nuanced instrumentation and sparsely deployed sonic effects.  Walker's voice resonates in a cavernous echo, taking on a haunted, distant, desolate quality, which one reviewer characterized as "Samuel Beckett at La Scala".

The opening track, "Farmer in the City", is subtitled "Remembering Pasolini".  A few of the lyrics are appropriated from Norman Macafee's English translation of Pier Paolo Pasolini's poem, "Uno dei tanti epiloghi" ("One of the Many Epilogs"), which was written in 1969 for Pasolini's friend and protégé, the scruffy young nonprofessional actor, Ninetto Davoli.  Throughout the song, Walker's chant of "Do I hear 21, 21, 21...?  I'll give you 21, 21, 21...", may be a reference to Davoli's age when he was drafted into (and subsequently deserted from) the Italian army.

The lyrics of "The Cockfighter" include "excerpts relocated from the trial of Queen Caroline and the trial of Adolf Eichmann".  "Bolivia '95" is apparently a song about South American refugees. The subtitle of "Manhattan", "flȇrdelē'", is a phonetic-matching corruption of the term fleur de lis, which is mentioned in the lyrics of the song.

In addition to a core lineup of musicians playing rock instruments, the recording also features contributions from the strings of Sinfonia of London and the Methodist Central Hall Pipe Organ, which were arranged and conducted by frequent collaborator Brian Gascoigne.

Track listing

Personnel

Players
Scott Walker – vocals, guitar on "Rosary"
Ian Thomas – drums
John Giblin – bass guitar
Brian Gascoigne – keyboards
David Rhodes – guitars

Additional players
"Farmer in the City"
Strings of Sinfonia of London, arranged and conducted by Brian Gascoigne
Elizabeth Kenny – chitarrone
Roy Carter – oboe
"The Cockfighter"
Hugh Burns – guitar
Alasdair Malloy – percussion
Louis Jardim – percussion
Andrew Cronshaw – horns and reeds
Brian Gascoigne – celeste and organ of the Methodist Central Hall
"Bouncer See Bouncer..."
Jonathan Snowden – flutes
Andy Findon – bass flute
Jim Gregory – bass flute
Roy Jowitt – clarinet
Roy Carter – oboe
Brian Gascoigne – woodwind orchestration and organ of the Methodist Central Hall
Peter Walsh – prog bass drum
"Manhattan"
Alasdair Malloy – percussion
Louis Jardim – percussion
Brian Gascoigne – organ of the Methodist Central Hall
Andrew Cronshaw – concertina
"Face on Breast"
Ian Thomas – "bass drum on lap and kit all at once"
Colin Pulbrook – Hammond organ
Scott Walker and Peter Walsh – whistles
"Bolivia '95"
Hugh Burns – guitars
Alasdair Malloy – percussion
Louis Jardim – percussion
Andrew Cronshaw – ba-wu flute
Greg Knowles – cimbalom
"Patriot (a single)"
Strings of Sinfonia of London, orchestrated and conducted by Brian Gascoigne
Jonathan Snowden – piccolo
John Barclay – trumpets
Ian Thomas – military bass drum and cymbals
"Rosary"
Scott Walker – guitar

Promo singles
Two promo CDs were released to promote Tilt on the radio and in record stores, containing edited versions of Tilt songs.

Scott 1 (Fontana – EEFR 1)
 "Patriot (a single)" (edit) – 4:40
 "The Cockfighter" (edit) – 4:07

Scott 2 (Fontana - EEFR 2)
 "Tilt" (edit) – 4:38
 "Farmer in the City" (edit) – 4:37

Charts

Release history
Receiving excellent reviews from critics the album was first released in Europe as a limited edition LP and CD in May 1995 before it was released in the US in 1997. The artwork for the album was designed by Stylorouge with photography and image manipulation of Walker's hand by David Scheinmann from a concept by Walker.

References

External links

Scott Walker interview - The Wire, May 1995

Scott Walker (singer) albums
1995 albums
Fontana Records albums
Drag City (record label) albums
Albums produced by Peter Walsh